Leo II (– November 474) was briefly Roman emperor in 474. He was the son of Zeno, the Isaurian general and future emperor, and Ariadne, a daughter of the emperor Leo I, who ruled the Eastern Roman empire. Leo II was made co-emperor with his grandfather Leo I on 17 November 473, and became sole emperor on 18 January 474 after Leo I died of dysentery. His father Zeno was made co-emperor by the Byzantine Senate on 29 January, and they co-ruled for a short time before Leo II died in November 474. The precise date of Leo's death is unknown.

History

Leo II was born in 467, the son of Zeno, an Isaurian general, and Ariadne, the daughter of then emperor Leo I. He was the maternal grandson of Emperor Leo I and Empress Verina. Leo I, who was becoming increasingly ill, felt obligated to declare a successor to the imperial throne, but passed over his son-in-law on account of his unpopularity. Accordingly, Leo II was made caesar around October 472, and was later promoted to augustus in November 473, making him co-emperor alongside his grandfather. He was crowned at the Hippodrome of Constantinople, and the ceremony was presided over by the Ecumenical Patriarch Acacius. The 10th century De Ceremoniis gives a detailed account of his coronation as augustus, which is dated to 17 November 473. He was also appointed as the sole consul for 474 around this time. When Leo I died of dysentery on 18 January 474, Leo II ascended the throne as sole augustus. On 29 January 474, the Byzantine Senate made his father Zeno co-augustus under Leo II, as he was too young to sign official documents. Leo II died some time after 10 October 474, at the age of 7, leaving Zeno as the sole emperor.

His death having occurred so soon after he became emperor has led to speculation among some modern scholars that he was poisoned by his mother Ariadne so that Zeno could ascend to the throne. However, no contemporary sources raised this suggestion, even though Zeno was unpopular, thus it is considered likely that Leo II's death was natural, especially when the high child mortality rate of the time is considered. Victor of Tunnuna, a 6th-century chronicler, says that Leo II did not actually die, but was rather taken by Ariadne and hidden at a monastery. This is likely a confusion with Basiliscus, the son of the Byzantine commander Armatus. Basiliscus was crowned caesar in 476 and was almost executed in 477 after his father was murdered by Zeno, but was saved by Ariadne. The confusion likely stems from the fact that Basiliscus was renamed Leo in order to avoid association with the usurper who rose against Zeno.

Zeno was vastly unpopular due to a lack of dynastic prestige, with his only familial ties to the imperial throne being his marriage to Ariadne, the daughter of Leo I, and through his now-dead son Leo II. Additionally, because he was an Isaurian, he was seen as a foreigner by the Byzantine elite, and the treasury was empty on his ascension. Zeno's sole rule was opposed by the House of Leo, with Verina, the widow of Leo I, proclaiming her brother Basiliscus as emperor in January 475. Zeno fled, and Basiliscus ruled for 20 months before Zeno returned and retook the throne. Zeno's rule was marked by constant unrest, and it was only through cunning and bribery that he managed to rule for 17 years, until his death on 9 April 491.

See also

 Family tree of Byzantine emperors
 List of Byzantine emperors

References

Notes

Citations

Primary sources

Anonymus Valesianus II (Anonymous, 6th century).
Chronicon Paschale (Anonymous, 7th century).
Makhtbhanuth Zabhne (Bar Hebraeus, 13th century).
Chronicle of Domninos (6th century).
Ecclesiastical History of Evagrius Scholasticus (6th century).
Book XIV of the Chronographia of John Malalas (6th century).
Romana (Jordanes, 6th century).
Chronicle of Michael the Syrian (12th century).
Chronicle of Nestorianos (6th century).
Chronicle of Theophanes the Confessor (8th century).
Chronicle of Victor of Tunnuna (6th century).
Extracts of History (Joannes Zonaras, 12th century).

Bibliography

 

McEvoy, M. A. (2019). 'Leo II, Zeno, and the transfer of power from a son to his father in AD 474', in J.-W. Drijvers and N. Lenski (eds). The Fifth Century: Age of Transformation. Edipuglia.

467 births
474 deaths
5th-century Byzantine emperors
5th-century Roman consuls
Ancient child monarchs
House of Leo
Imperial Roman consuls
Monarchs who died as children
Sons of Byzantine emperors